Mark Anthony Weir (19 September 1967) is an English retired mixed martial artist usually fighting in the middleweight division at 185 lbs. He has fought in the UFC, the WEC, PRIDE, Cage Rage, UCMMA, Pancrase, and BodogFIGHT. He is the former Cage Rage British Middleweight Champion.

Background
Weir began his martial arts training with Judo and Boxing, but later switched to Tae Kwon Do because his mother did not want him to box full-time. He gained his black belt in 1988 from Hee Il Cho, then 3 months later went on to win two World Titles and, at the age of 20, became the youngest fighter to ever win a World Championship. Proving his consistency Weir went on to win another two world titles in 1991. Weir not only went undefeated in Tae Kwon Do competitions, but also held an undefeated record in Kickboxing. After which he began training in Jiu-Jitsu. And started competing in MMA

Mixed martial arts career

Early career
Weir made his professional mixed martial arts debut in 1996, however he continued to practice both the traditional art and  MMA. This was until 2000 when Weir made the decision to solely concentrate on his MMA fighting career.

Ultimate Fighting Championship
Weir made his UFC debut at UFC 38 on 13 July 2002 against Eugene Jackson. This was the UFC's inaugural appearance in the United Kingdom, and Weir won via knockout due to a punch only 10 seconds into the fight.

Weir made his next appearance for the promotion at UFC 40, in 'the fight of the year' against Phillip Miller and was defeated in the second round via rear-naked choke submission. Weir then fought at UFC 42 against David Loiseau and was defeated via knockout in the first round. Loiseau continued on his winning streak to gain a title shot, against Richard Franklin.

Cage Rage and WEC
Weir then signed with Cage Rage in his home country of England and made his promotional debut at Cage Rage 4 and won via rear-naked choke submission in the first round. Weir would go 3-2 in his next five fights before making his debut in the WEC. Weir made his debut at WEC 12 and won in the first round via guillotine choke submission.

Weir returned to Cage Rage with mixed fortune, however it wasn't long until Weir was back on winning form. At Cage Rage 12, Weir defeated Sol Gilbert via TKO at the end of the second round to become the inaugural Cage Rage British Middleweight Champion. Weir went on to defend his title against Akri Shoji, winning by KOREA in 16 secs.

PRIDE
After the win over Shoji, Weir had to make a huge decision whether to return to UFC or make his name in Japan. Weir decided on Japan and made his PRIDE debut at Pride Bushido 10 on 2 April 2006 against Denis Kang who was on a 16 fight winning streak. Weir lost after he submitted due to knee strikes at the end of the first round.

UCMMA
On his return to the UK, Weir captured the UCMMA Middleweight Championship at UCMMA 11: Adrenaline Rush on 27 March 2010, defeating Jack Mason at the end of the second round via knockout. Weir then lost his first title defense at UCMMA 21: Stand Your Ground when he was knocked out by Denniston Sutherland. Weir made his most recent appearance at SFC: Supremacy Fight Challenge 9 on 17 February 2013 and won via rear-naked choke submission in the first round. This was to be Weir's final appearance in MMA before he announced his retirement in 2014.

Kickboxing career
In 2010, Weir won the vacant UCMMA Kickboxing Championship by defeating Mark Epstein. Weir also won the Middleweight Championship by defeating Jack Mason via knockout. Weir then successfully defended his title at Unbelievable 16 on 23 October 2010 against Luke Sines.

Weir then lost his Middleweight Championship, being defeated via knockout by Louis King.

Personal life
Weir lives in Hempsted, England, with his wife and four children.

Championships and accomplishments
World Extreme Cagefighting
WEC North American Middleweight Championship (One time)
Cage Rage
Cage Rage British Middleweight British Championship (One time) First
Ultimate Challenge MMA
Ultimate Challenge MMA Middleweight Championship (One time)

Mixed martial arts record

|-
| Win
| align=center| 21–18–1
| Mickey Burns
| Submission (rear-naked choke)
| SFC: Supremacy Fight Challenge 9
| 
| align=center| 1
| align=center| 1:04
| Gateshead, Tyne and Wear, England
| 
|-
| Loss
| align=center| 20–18–1
| Denniston Sutherland
| KO (punches)
| UCMMA 21: Stand Your Ground
| 
| align=center| 1
| align=center| 3:20
| London, England
| Lost UCMMA Middleweight Championship
|-
| Win
| align=center| 20–17–1
| Jack Mason
| KO (knee and punches)
| UCMMA 11: Adrenaline Rush
| 
| align=center| 2
| align=center| 4:57
| London, England
| Won UCMMA Middleweight Championship
|-
| Loss
| align=center| 19–17–1
| Tor Troéng
| Submission (triangle choke)
| Superior Challenge 4
| 
| align=center| 3
| align=center| 2:05
| Stockholm, Sweden
| 
|-
| Draw
| align=center| 19–16–1
| Jean-François Lénogue
| Draw
| Furious Fighting Championship 2
| 
| align=center| 3
| align=center| 5:00
| Casablanca, Morocco
| 
|-
| Loss
| align=center| 19–16
| Mohamed Khacha
| TKO (punches)
| UCMMA 2: Unbreakable
| 
| align=center| 1
| align=center| 4:26
| London, England
| 
|-
| Win
| align=center| 19–15
| Marius Buzinskas
| Submission (arm-triangle choke)
| CFC 4: No Way Out
| 
| align=center| 2
| align=center| 2:04
| England
| 
|-
| Loss
| align=center| 18–15
| Drew Fickett
| Submission (rear-naked choke)
| Cage Rage 24
| 
| align=center| 1
| align=center| 3:55
| London, England
| 
|-
| Loss
| align=center| 18–14
| Paul Daley
| TKO (punches)
| Cage Rage 23
| 
| align=center| 2
| align=center| 2:14
| London, England
|For Cage Rage World Welterweight Championship and Cage Rage British Middleweight Championship.
|-
| Loss
| align=center| 18–13
| Nick Thompson
| TKO
| BodogFIGHT: Vancouver
| 
| align=center| 1
| align=center| 4:01
| Vancouver, British Columbia, Canada
| 
|-
| Win
| align=center| 18–12
| Daijiro Matsui
| Decision (unanimous)
| Cage Rage 21
| 
| align=center| 3
| align=center| 5:00
| London, England
| 
|-
| Loss
| align=center| 17–12
| Zelg Galešic
| TKO (punches)
| Cage Rage 19
| 
| align=center| 1
| align=center| 0:50
| London, England
| 
|-
| Loss
| align=center| 17–11
| Murilo Rua
| Submission (arm triangle choke)
| Cage Rage 18
| 
| align=center| 2
| align=center| 1:15
| London, England
| 
|-
| Loss
| align=center| 17–10
| Denis Kang
| Submission (knees)
| PRIDE Bushido 10
| 
| align=center| 1
| align=center| 4:55
| Tokyo, Japan
| 
|-
| Win
| align=center| 17–9
| Akira Shoji
| KO (head kick)
| Cage Rage 14
| 
| align=center| 1
| align=center| 0:17
| London, England
| 
|-
| Win
| align=center| 16–9
| Kyosuke Sasaki
| KO (punches)
| Cage Rage 13
| 
| align=center| 1
| align=center| 1:52
| London, England
| 
|-
| Win
| align=center| 15–9
| Sol Gilbert
| TKO (corner stoppage)
| Cage Rage 12
| 
| align=center| 2
| align=center| 5:00
| London, England
|<small>Won Cage Rage British Middleweight Championship.
|-
| Loss
| align=center| 14–9
| Curtis Stout
| TKO (punches)
| Cage Rage 11
| 
| align=center| 1
| align=center| 1:45
| London, England
| 
|-
| Loss
| align=center| 14–8
| Alex Serdyukov
| Submission (arm triangle choke)
|  WEC 14: Vengeance
| 
| align=center| 2
| align=center| 2:56
| Lemoore, California, United States
| 
|-
| Loss
| align=center| 14–7
| Gabriel Santos
| Decision (unanimous)
| Cage Rage 10
| 
| align=center| 3
| align=center| 5:00
| London, England
| 
|-
| Loss
| align=center| 14–6
| Matt Lindland
| TKO (doctor stoppage)
| Cage Rage 9
| 
| align=center| 1
| align=center| 5:00
| London, England
| 
|-
| Win
| align=center| 14–5
| Will Bradford
| Submission (fist choke)
| WEC 12
| 
| align=center| 1
| align=center| 2:11
| Lemoore, California, United States
| 
|-
| Win
| align=center| 13–5
| Johil de Oliveira
| Submission (arm-triangle choke)
| Cage Rage 8
| 
| align=center| 1
| align=center| 1:35
| London, England
| 
|-
| Loss
| align=center| 12–5
| Jorge Rivera
| TKO (doctor stoppage)
| Cage Rage 7
| 
| align=center| 1
| align=center| 5:00
| London, England
| 
|-
| Win
| align=center| 12–4
| Gen Isono
| TKO (corner stoppage)
| Pain and Glory
| 
| align=center| 
| align=center| 
| England
| align=center| 
|-
| Win
| align=center| 11–4
| Alex Reid
| TKO (cut)
| Extreme Brawl 6
| 
| align=center| 2
| 
| Bracknell, England
| 
|-
| Loss
| align=center| 10–4
| Gregory Bouchelaghem
| Submission (rear-naked choke)
| XFC 2: The Perfect Storm
| 
| align=center| 1
| 
| Cornwall, England
| 
|-
| Win
| align=center| 10–3
| Jean-François Lénogue
| Submission (rear-naked choke)
| Cage Rage 4
| 
| align=center| 1
| align=center| 4:13
| London, England
| 
|-
| Loss
| align=center| 9–3
| David Loiseau
| KO (punches)
| UFC 42
| 
| align=center| 1
| align=center| 3:55
| Miami, Florida, United States
| 
|-
| Loss
| align=center| 9–2
| Phillip Miller
| Submission (rear-naked choke)
| UFC 40
| 
| align=center| 2
| align=center| 4:50
| Las Vegas, Nevada, United States
| 
|-
| Win
| align=center| 9–1
| Eugene Jackson
| KO (punch)
| UFC 38
| 
| align=center| 1
| align=center| 0:10
| London, England
| 
|-
| Win
| align=center| 8–1
| Ben Earwood
| TKO (submission to punches)
| MB 5: Unfinished Business
| 
| align=center| 2
| 
| High Wycombe, England
| 
|-
| Win
| align=center| 7–1
| Shannon Ritch
| Submission (choke)
| MB 3: Independence Day
| 
| align=center| 1
| 
| High Wycombe, England
| 
|-
| Win
| align=center| 6–1
| Paul Jenkins
| KO
| Grapple & Strike 3
| 
| align=center| 1
| align=center| 0:18
| Worcester, England
| 
|-
| Win
| align=center| 5–1
| CJ Fernandes
| TKO
| MB 2: Capital Punishment
| 
| align=center| 
| align=center| 
| High Wycombe, England
| align=center| 
|-
| Win
| align=center| 4–1
| Sean Cocharin
| TKO
| Ultimate Fight Night
| 
| align=center| 1
| 
| High Wycombe, England
| 
|-
| Win
| align=center| 3–1
| Frank Ledroumaguet
| Submission (armbar)
| Pancrase: Pancrase UK
| 
| align=center| 
| align=center| 
| London, England
| align=center| 
|-
| Win
| align=center| 2–1
| John Andrews
| Submission (choke)
| Grapple & Strike 2
| 
| align=center| 1
| 
| Worcester, England
| 
|-
| Win
| align=center| 1–1
| Dale Houghton
| Submission (forearm choke)
| Ring of Truth 3
| 
| align=center| 1
| align=center| 1:16
| England
| 
|-
| Loss
| align=center| 0–1
| Trevor Cunningham
| KO
| Grapple & Strike 1
| 
| align=center| 2
| align=center| 4:17
| Worcester, England
|

See also
 List of male mixed martial artists

References

1. ‘A Day in the Life Of…’, Helen Blow, ‘’The Citizen’’, 4 February 1999

2. ‘Scott hopes for a box office hit’, Annelisa Macaulay-Lowe, ‘’The Citizen’’, 19 August 1999

3. ‘Scott’s a dead ringer for a film mogul’, ‘’The Citizen’’, 3 September 2001

4. ‘Horton is choked at loss’, ‘’The Citizen’’, 27 October 2000

5. XFUK Profile

6. ‘Horton is choked at loss’, ‘’The Citizen’’, 27 October 2000

7. UCMMA Events

External links
 
 

1967 births
Living people
English male kickboxers
Sportspeople from Gloucester
English male mixed martial artists
Welterweight mixed martial artists
Middleweight mixed martial artists
Mixed martial artists utilizing taekwondo
English male taekwondo practitioners
Black British sportsmen
Ultimate Fighting Championship male fighters